The Alta conflict or Alta controversy refers to a series of massive protests in Norway in the late 1970s and early 1980s concerning the construction of a hydroelectric power plant in the Alta River in Finnmark, Northern Norway.

Timeline
Inhabitants of Máze rallied, and formed "Aksjonskomiteen mot neddemming av Masi", August 15, 1970
A group named "Altautvalget for bevaring av Alta-Kautokeinovassdraget", had been documenting the detrimental effects on salmon and "the nature" of the Alta-canyon, since 1973. (The group has been credited, in large, for influencing the municipal council of Alta's opposition to the construction project.)
"Folkeaksjonen mot utbygging av Alta-Kautokeinovassdraget" was founded at the local highschool (Alta gymnas), by around 80 protesters, on July 12, 1978
The Detsika Camp was established in the summer of 1979. It received 6500  visitors from 20 nations—a number of the visitors were demonstrators.  
Later in 1979 the Stilla Camp was established, and the Detsika Camp (which was a cultural gathering and a political workshop) was disestablished.
"Folkeaksjonen -" held an election at an "ekstaordinær" annual meeting in Alta on January 24, 1982, which concluded that the organization was to be disassembled. (One of the reasons for disassembling the organization, was to avoid being blamed for sabotage and criminal acts, such as the pyromanic acts that had taken place, in the previous Christmas holidays, against mobile constructions belonging to NVE.)
"Folkeaksjonen -" had its last national conference, in May 1982.
Proceedings in court (Alta herredsrett) against Alfred Nilsen, Bongo, Suhr and Flatberg, commence March 1, 1983. They are later sentenced to fines (10 000 to 20 000 Norwegian kroner) and suspended prison sentences (60–90 days).

History
The background for the controversy was a published plan by the Norwegian Water Resources and Energy Directorate (NVE) that called for the construction of a dam and hydroelectric power plant that would create an artificial lake and inundate the Sami village of Máze. After the initial plan met political resistance, a less ambitious project was proposed that would cause less displacement of Sami residents and less disruption for reindeer migration and wild salmon fishing.

On July 12, 1978, the popular movement against development of the Alta-Kautokeino waterway (Folkeaksjonen mot utbygging av Alta-Kautokeinovassdraget) was founded, creating an organizational platform for first opposing and then resisting construction work.  This group and others filed for an injunction in Norwegian courts against the Norwegian government to prevent construction from beginning.

In the fall of 1979, as construction was ready to start, protesters performed two acts of civil disobedience: at the construction site itself at Stilla, activists sat down on the ground and blocked the machines, and at the same time, Sami activists began a hunger strike outside the Norwegian parliament.

Documents that have since been declassified, show that the government planned to use military forces as logistical support for police authorities in their efforts to stop the protests.

The prime minister at the time, Odvar Nordli, pre-empted such an escalation by promising a review of the parliament's decision, but the Norwegian parliament subsequently confirmed its decision to dam the river. More than one thousand protesters chained themselves to the site when the work started again in January 1981. The police responded with large forces; at one point 10% of all Norwegian police officers were stationed in Alta (during which time they were quartered in a cruise ship). The protesters were forcibly removed by police.

For the first time since World War II, Norwegians were arrested and charged with violating laws against rioting. The central organizations for the Sami people discontinued all cooperation with the Norwegian government. Two Sami women even travelled to Rome to petition the Pope.

The Supreme Court ruled in favor of the government in early 1982, at which point organized opposition to the power plant ceased, and construction of the Alta Hydroelectric Power Station was completed by 1987.

Legacy

As the first serious political upheaval since the debate about Norwegian EC membership in 1972, the Alta controversy was important in several ways:
 It put the rights of the Sami as an indigenous people with distinct rights over the lands in Northern Norway, onto the national political agenda. This process reached a key milestone in 2005, when the Finnmark Act was passed. It is considered that though the Sami lost the battle over this particular issue, they made important long-term gains.
 It unified formerly disparate environmental groups with respect to a common cause.
 Revived Sami interest in their culture and rolled back efforts of the Norwegian government's Norwegianization policy.

The NGO organised the opposition against the construction in the Alta controversy, and had at the most 20,000 members. Of these 10,000 actively participated in demonstrations, including the Stilla March. The organisation functioned as a cooperation between environmentalists and Sami activists, and not only succeeded at putting focus on environmental issues but also on Sami rights.

After their acts of civil disobedience, the four leaders, Alfred Nilsen, Tore Bongo, Svein Suhr and Per Flatberg (information leader), were sentenced for encouraging illegal acts.

La Elva Leve! ["let the river live"] was a 1980 docudrama inspired by the events of the Alta protests.

In 2014 "in one of the scenes of the Donald Duck Christmas story, mining activists—clad in gákti—and a chain gang show up. Associations to the Alta conflict of the 70s and 80s, where there was great resistance to the building of a dam on the Alta River, are clear", according to NRK. A documentary film Tidsvitne: Alta-kampen ["the Alta Struggle" episode of the Tidsvitne series] was produced by NRK.

A subplot in the 2019 animated musical film Frozen II where a dam built on tribal land by King Runeard, Elsa and Anna's grandfather, alludes to the Alta controversy. Runeard had the dam built ostensibly as a gift to the Northuldra—a fictional tribe inspired by the Sámi people—but was actually a means to further subjugate the tribe whom the king distrusted for their reliance on magic.

See also
Environmental racism in Europe

References

Works cited

Literature
 Norwegian Ministry of Foreign Affairs The Sami in Norway
 Bård Berg: 25 år i skyttergravene? Fra kampen om Alta/Kautokeino-vassdraget til Bondevik-regjeringens forslag til Finnmarkslov 
 Lars Martin Hjorthol: Alta -  Kraftkampen som utfordret statens makt ["the power struggle that challenged the government's power"], Gyldendal, 2006

External links
Tidsvitne: Alta-kampen (Documentary film viewable from Norwegian IP addresses)
- AKP ville hjelpe samene med sabotasje - I 1981 ble Samebevegelsen flere ganger kontaktet og tilbudt hjelp til terror- og sabotasjeaksjoner mot mål i Norge. Henvendelsene kom fra både IRA og venstreradikale nordmenn, mest sannsynlig AKP-medlemmer. [The Workers' Communist Party wanted to help the Sami with sabotage - In 1981, Samebevegelsen was contacted several times, and offered help with terror- and sabotage attacks against targets in Norway. Contact came from both IRA and leftist Norwegians, most probably AKP members.]
Ville sprenge skip i Alta - Under Alta-striden planla venstreradikale nordmenn å sprenge politibåten «Janina», som lå i Alta med 800 politifolk om bord.

Political history of Norway
Environmental protests in Norway
Sámi politics
Political controversies in Norway
Controversy
1978 in Norway
1979 in Norway
1980 in Norway
1981 in Norway
1982 in Norway
Dam controversies